The Partido Abe Kapampangan  is a local city-based political party in Angeles City.  The party is headed by incumbent Angeles City Mayor Edgardo Pamintuan Sr. and the city's chief of staff, Alexander Cauguiran.  It is the ruling political group in Angeles City, with almost all its elected officials under it.

External links
 
 
 

Local political parties in the Philippines
Political parties established in 2012
Politics of Pampanga
Regionalist parties
Regionalist parties in the Philippines
2012 establishments in the Philippines